Christopher Sanderson (27 July 1954  – 24 April 1977) was an English professional rugby league footballer who played in the 1970s.

Playing career

County Cup Final appearances
Chris Sanderson was an interchange/substitute in Leeds' 15-11 victory over Hull Kingston Rovers in the 1975 Yorkshire County Cup Final during the 1975–76 season at Headingley Stadium on Saturday 15 November 1975, and was an interchange/substitute in the 16-12 victory over Featherstone Rovers in the 1976 Yorkshire County Cup Final during the 1976–77 season at Headingley Stadium on Saturday 16 October 1976.

Club career
Chris Sanderson's Leeds début came against Halifax on 8 September 1971, and he played in the Challenge Cup matches during the 1974–75 season against Bradford Northern and Salford, and the semi-final defeat by Warrington.

Death

Incident

During Leeds' match (with the score at 5-2 to Leeds, subsequently abandoned, and not replayed) against Salford at the Willows on Sunday 24 April 1977, Chris Sanderson collapsed following a tackle in the eighth minute, he died later that day at a nearby hospital.

Testimonial match
Leeds' 1976–77 Challenge Cup victory was dedicated to Chris Sanderson, and his wife Sally's first guest invited into the Leeds dressing room. Chris Sanderson's testimonial match at Leeds on the Thursday 12 May 1977, was a match between Leeds and Great Britain, it was attended by 11,000 people and raised £7,000 for his family (based on increases in average earnings, this would be approximately £59,830 in 2013).

References

External links
Search for "Sanderson" at rugbyleagueproject.org

 (archived by web.archive.org) Chris Sanderson Remembered
Search for "Christopher Sanderson" at britishnewspaperarchive.co.uk
Search for "Chris Sanderson" at britishnewspaperarchive.co.uk

1954 births
1977 deaths
English rugby league players
Leeds Rhinos players
Rugby league five-eighths
Rugby league halfbacks
Sport deaths in England
Rugby league players from York